Cumulus Mountain is a mountain,  high, immediately north of the Hogsenga Crags in the Mühlig-Hofmann Mountains of Queen Maud Land. It was mapped from surveys and air photos by the Sixth Norwegian Antarctic Expedition (1956–60) and named Cumulusfjellet (Cumulus Mountain).

References
 

Mountains of Queen Maud Land
Princess Astrid Coast